Canton of Chemillé-en-Anjou (before 2015: Canton of Chemillé, between 2015 and March 2020: Canton of Chemillé-Melay) is a canton of France, located in the Maine-et-Loire department, in the Pays de la Loire region. At the French canton reorganisation which came into effect in March 2015, the canton was renamed and expanded from 9 to 24 communes (19 of which merged into the new communes of Chemillé-en-Anjou, Bellevigne-en-Layon and Terranjou in December 2015, January 2016 and January 2017):

Aubigné-sur-Layon 
Beaulieu-sur-Layon
Bellevigne-en-Layon
Chemillé-en-Anjou
Mozé-sur-Louet
Terranjou
Val-du-Layon

See also 
 Cantons of the Maine-et-Loire department
 Communes of the Maine-et-Loire department

References

External links
  canton of Chemillé on the web of the General Council of Maine-et-Loire

Cantons of Maine-et-Loire